Alan Blyth ( – 1953) was an English artist who primarily painted landscape and botanical paintings, predominantly in the oil medium.

Life and work

Alan Blyth was born 14 August 1889 in Nowshera Bengal, India, the son of Frederick Augustus Blyth (Colonel Indian Army) and Margaret (nee Tulloch).  He studied at the Royal Academy of Arts between 23 January 1923 and January 1928. He married Elsie North Anderson (b. 1891) on 6 July 1930.  He died 4 February 1956 at Pine Tree Cottage, Exeter Road, Ottery St Mary, Devon.

He exhibited at the majority of London galleries including the New English Art Club, the Royal Academy, Royal Society of Portrait Painters, Royal Institute of Painters in Water Colours, Royal Institute of Oil Painters and Walker's Gallery.

The label of the Royal Society of Portrait Painters on his portrait in oils entitled 'Vera' gives his address at the time as 'Jacques', Garboldisham, Diss, Norfolk. During the 1990s work by Blyth appeared in auctions at Bonham's and Christie's. However, for such a widely exhibited artist it is unusual that little other biographical information is known.

Exhibitions
(Solo)
An exhibition of water-colour drawings: October 31 to November 12, 1927 / by Alan Blyth - Walker's Gallery, London

(Group)

Pictures exhibited at the Royal Academy, London
1925 - The Black Mountains, Brecon
1932 - Rough Water
1935 - Autumn Bunch,
1935 - Cineraria
1936 - Winter Morning
1937 - A Suffolk Road
1938 - Coronation fantasy
1940 - Evening at an R.A.F. Aerodrome
1940 - Building an R.A.F. Aerodrome
1945 - The Roads of France
1945 - The Aftermath
1947 - Blakeney
1948 - Quinces
1949 - Trees at Preston, Suffolk
1951 - The Begonia
1953 - Still life

References
An exhibition of water-colour drawings: October 31 to November 12, 1927 / by Alan Blyth Catalogue of an exhibition held at Walker's Galleries, London.
Johnson, J. The Dictionary of British Artists 1880-1940 (Antique Collectors Club, 1980)
Royal Academy Exhibitors 1905-1970, Vol I (EP Publishing LTD, 1979)

Notes

20th-century English painters
English male painters
English portrait painters
Landscape artists
Year of birth missing
1953 deaths
20th-century English male artists